Jonathan Yudis is an American film director. He made his feature film debut in 2005 with Pervert!, a tribute to the films of Russ Meyer. He also directed the live-action segments of the Ren and Stimpy Adult Party Cartoon episode Firedogs 2. His wife is the daughter of filmmaker Ralph Bakshi.

In 2015 he was directing the comedy film Aloha Santa.

References

External links

Q&A with Jonathan Yudis

1971 births
Living people
Artists from Philadelphia
Film directors from Pennsylvania
American male screenwriters
Film producers from Pennsylvania
American television writers
American television directors
American animators
American animated film directors
American animated film producers
Television producers from Pennsylvania
American male voice actors
American male film actors
21st-century American male actors
Screenwriters from Pennsylvania
American male television writers